KCHI (1010 AM) is a radio station broadcasting a classic hits music format. Licensed to Chillicothe, Missouri, United States.  The station is currently owned by Leatherman Communications.

History
On May 9, 2007 the station was sold to Leatherman Communications.

Previous logo
 (logo under previous KCH-FM 98.5 frequency)

References

External links

CHI
Classic hits radio stations in the United States
Radio stations established in 2007